Worth School is a private co-educational Roman Catholic boarding and day school for pupils from 11 to 18 years of age near Worth, West Sussex, England. Until 2008, Worth was exclusively a boys' school. It is one of the three prominent Benedictine independent boarding schools in the United Kingdom; the other two being Ampleforth and Downside. For the academic year 2015/16, Worth charged day pupils up to £7,275 per term, making it the 42nd most expensive HMC day school. It is a public school in the British sense of the term.

History

In 1617 the Benedictine community of English and Welsh monks that had founded Downside School in Douai established a preparatory school to educate the younger pupils. At the time, both schools were located in France due to the severe penal laws in England imposed against Catholics. This way, English Catholics were able to send their children to study across the channel. After an incident with French revolutionaries in 1790, the school had to move back to England, where laws against Catholics had become more flexible. After several years in Acton Burnell, the monks finally settled in Stratton-on-the-Fosse, Somerset, in 1814; this is the current location of Downside School.

In 1933 the Paddockhurst country estate of Lord Cowdray was purchased by Downside Abbey. John Chapman, Abbot of Downside, relocated the junior school to the estate, thus establishing a preparatory school for boys aged 7 to 13 named Worth Priory. This school, set in the mansion house of Paddockhurst, was a junior school for Downside School. Having 60 pupils at foundation, numbers rose to 100 in 1939 when the school was evacuated and moved to Downside Abbey for the duration of the Second World War. In 1957 pupil numbers rose to 256, the school becoming the second largest preparatory school in the country.

In 1957 Worth Abbey became independent from Downside Abbey, and shortly after this an independent senior school, Worth School, for boys aged 13 to 18, was founded (1959). The former Worth Preparatory School remained separate from the senior school and was progressively scaled-down until in 1965 it became The Junior House for boys aged 11 to 13.

Worth remained a purely boarding school until the 1990s, when day students were first admitted, and two day houses were founded, one inheriting the name of Worth's founder, Chapman, the other named for its first Abbot, Farwell. Worth was the first English Benedictine school to combine the boarding and day traditions in this way.

In October 1999 the School hosted the first International Conference on Benedictine Education. Over one hundred Benedictine educators, monks, nuns and lay people came from sixty Benedictine schools in fifteen countries to work together on developing the Benedictine tradition of education. At this meeting work began on establishing The International Commission on Benedictine Education (ICBE) which was founded in November 2002 to support those schools which promote a Benedictine vision of education.

In 2002 Worth School was established as a separate charity from Worth Abbey, with its own Board of Governors and a lay chairman. This was the first time that a Benedictine school in England had established a fully independent lay Board of Governors.

Girls were accepted into the sixth form from September 2008. Girls were admitted into the lower years in 2010. A boarding house and a day house for girls were subsequently founded.

In 2005 the Office of Fair Trading found fifty independent schools, including Worth, to have breached the Competition Act by "regularly and systematically" exchanging information about planned increases in school fees, which was collated and distributed among the schools by the bursar at Sevenoaks School. Following the investigation by the OFT, each school was required to pay around £70,000, totalling around £3.5 million, significantly less than the maximum possible fine. In addition, the schools together agreed to contribute another £3m to a new charitable educational fund. The incident raised concerns over whether the charitable status of independent schools such as Worth should be reconsidered, and perhaps revoked. However, Jean Scott, the head of the Independent Schools Council, said the schools were following a long-established procedure in sharing the information with each other because independent schools were previously exempt from anti-cartel rules applied to business and that they were unaware of the change to the law (on which they had not been consulted). She wrote to John Vickers, the OFT director-general, saying, "They are not a group of businessmen meeting behind closed doors to fix the price of their products to the disadvantage of the consumer. They are schools that have quite openly continued to follow a long-established practice because they were unaware that the law had changed."
In March 2009 the school celebrated its 75th anniversary, with a special mass for the whole school community in Westminster Cathedral. The school was welcomed by Cardinal Cormac Murphy-O'Connor and the mass was celebrated in the presence of Archbishop Faustino Sainz Muñoz, Apostolic Nuncio to Great Britain. It is the first time that a Benedictine school has ever assembled for such an occasion at Westminster Cathedral. The school choir performed a specially composed motet by Colin Mawby, a former Director of Music at the Cathedral and one of Britain's leading liturgical composers.

In July 2009 racing driver Henry Surtees, age 18, had just finished his A-levels at Worth, when he died in an accident during a Formula Two race at Brands Hatch, Kent. The school commemorated this former pupil by naming a school social centre in his honour, and by a cross-Channel swim to raise £15,000 for Sussex Air Ambulance, the Surtees family's nominated charity.

During 2011 extended sports facilities were opened, including the school's first Astroturf. In the same year the Abbey Church, used daily by the school for a wide variety of functions, was extensively refurbished. The Abbey Church (constructed between 1965 and 1975) was designed by the English architect Francis Pollen, and "is considered by many to be the best example of his style". The refurbished interior, by Thomas Heatherwick Studios, won the West Sussex County Council Design and Sustainability Scheme Restoration Award for 2011. Judges found that "Thoughtful design and superb execution make for a wonderful restoration, proving that in the right hands contemporary architecture can be used to create an exceptional place for prayer and contemplation".

In November 2011 a 13-year-old pupil, William Avery-Wright, died in a road accident on the B2110 Paddockhurst Road while crossing unsupervised. His funeral was held in the Abbey Church in December of that year. Subsequently, the bereaved family have been critical of the school and in January 2014 the Conservative MP for Wealden, Charles Hendry, called for the resignation of the school's Headmaster, Gino Carminati, and Chair of Governors, Alda Andreotti.

In September 2012 a new building for the boys boarding house, St Bede's, was opened in a woodland setting near the school golf course. Designed by architects Miller Bourne (Hove), the building houses 60 boarders, along with a housemaster's family house and a flat for a residential tutor. The St Bede's building won the 2012 Sussex Heritage Trust Award in the large commercial category.

In 2012 Tatler reported that 8% of the school's students later go on to study at either Oxford or Cambridge Universities.

In June 2013 in co-operation with The Jesuit Institute, the school was host to an educational conference on the Identity and Mission of Catholic Schools. Attracting over 40 international participants, the two-day event focused on sustaining and developing the ethos of Catholic schools. This was the first time that schools in the UK from the Benedictine and Jesuit traditions of education had co-operated in such a manner. Later in the same year, the school opened a pedestrian footbridge across the B2110 Paddockhurst Road, thereby more directly linking its main site with its nearby playing fields. Because the school is located in the High Weald Area of Outstanding Natural Beauty the bridge was designed so that its impact is minimised.

In August 2015 Stuart McPherson (an Eton College former housemaster) assumed the leadership of the school community as Head Master. McPherson is the school's third lay Head Master, and, by co-incidence, its third Australian Head.

In 2017 The National College for Teaching and Leadership banned David Brown indefinitely from teaching. Brown, then a part-time singing teacher at the school had an affair with a Sixth-Form pupil in 2015. It was reported that Brown, had messaged the student encouraging her to take drugs in order to improve the sexual side of their relationship, whilst also sending the student images containing nudity.

In December 2018 Worth was named among the 100 cricketing schools in Britain for the first time. In 2019, 2020, 2021 and 2022, Worth was again included in the annual list compiled by The Cricketer.

In the summer of 2019 a former student, Michael Spencer, made an extraordinary gift of £6.25 million for the school to build a new sixth form centre, which opened in April 2022. In July 2022, the new building won a Sussex Heritage Trust award.

Music

In 2014 Worth pupils gained places at the Junior Royal Academy of Music as well as an organ scholarship at Keble College, Oxford. In April 2016, the school's choir were the first to sing at a papal mass alongside the Sistine Chapel Choir. Thirty six pupils sang the liturgy celebrated by Pope Francis with a special focus on young people for the Jubilee Year of Mercy. The school's choir returned to Rome in July 2018 when they became the first school choir ever to sing alone in the Sistine Chapel. In 2022, the schola cantorum had the honour of signing Mass at Westminster Cathedral.

Media coverage

Although neither the school nor pupils were involved, the BBC documentary titled "The Monastery" was filmed in the abbey in 2005, and showed part of Worth's campus from the air in its introduction.

Robert Whitehead

Robert Whitehead, inventor of the torpedo, built the school's clocktower and model farm, having thereafter a room named after him.

Head Masters 
The Head Master is a member of the Headmasters' and Headmistresses' Conference.

1933 – 1936 Dom Austin Corney
1936 – 1940 Dom Oliver Brayden
1940 – 1959 Dom Maurice Bell
1959 – 1976 Dom Dominic Gaisford
1977 – 1983 Dom Kevin Taggart
1983 – 1993 Dom Stephen Ortiger
1994 – 2002 Dom Christopher Jamison
2002 – 2007 Peter Armstrong
2007 – 2015 Gino Carminati
2015 – Stuart McPherson

Houses

Notable alumni 

Former pupils include Formula Two driver Henry Surtees, comedian Harry Enfield, actor Robert Bathurst, rugby union players Tom Mitchell (rugby union, born 1989) and Nick Walshe, executive Sir John Chisholm, baronet Sir Dermot de Trafford, historian Michael Aris, antiques expert Philip Mould, and various members of the Marcos family and Zobel de Ayala family.

Fictional alumni 
Tory Boy, a notorious character from a sketch by Harry Enfield, is a fictional Old Worthian. It was a satirical portrayal of those boys from prominent catholic families that Enfield attended school with. The term Tory Boy has since been used as a caricature of young Conservative MPs.

Notable staff
Andrew Bertie: Teacher. On 12 August 2012 The Times of Malta reported that "The process for the beatification of the late Grand Master and Prince Fra' Andrew Willoughby Ninian Bertie is to begin in the coming months".

Further reading
Condon, Ian; A House Called Paddockhurst: A Short History of Worth's Victorian Mansion. Worth School (February 2010). 
Gushurst-Moore, Andre; The Common Mind. Worth School (January 2013). 
Gushurst-Moore, Andre; Glory In All Things: St Benedict and Catholic Education Today. Worth School (January 2020).

References

External links

School Website
Profile on the ISC website
ISI Inspection Reports
Ofsted Inspection Reports
Worth Preparatory School archive

 
Schools of the English Benedictine Congregation
Member schools of the Headmasters' and Headmistresses' Conference
Buildings and structures in Crawley
Private schools in West Sussex
International Baccalaureate schools in England
Catholic boarding schools in England
Roman Catholic private schools in the Diocese of Arundel and Brighton
Boarding schools in West Sussex
Educational institutions established in 1933
1933 establishments in England